Ulhas Koravi Satyanarayan, mostly referred to as Ulhas KS, is an Indian professional basketball player.

As of December 2021, he has been the only Indian professional basketball player in Europe.

Early life
He is originally from Kancheepuram in Tamil Nadu. He started basketball at age 7.

Basketball career
Ulhas hails from G D Goenka Public School, New Delhi. He played in the Under-19 national school league and Delhi Open league, winning gold and bronze in the two tournaments.

In 2016, he joined Westminster Business School (WBS) in Marylebone, Central London. He initially got selected to play in the 1st team (out of 3). Ulhas was pivotal in the clubs success in 2017–18, running the offense as starting point guard, leading the Westminster Dragons to their first university title in 7 years. In his 3rd year in England he played in the National Basketball League.

After graduation from Westminster, Ulhas played in a semi-professional 3x3 basketball league 3BL in India. There, he played for New Delhi's team Old School Ballers and won the 2019 championship.

In mid-2021, he started his fully professional career with Gloria of the Moldovan National Division. As of mid-December 2021 he was the league's second-best scorer. He helped his team Gloria secure the bronze medal at the 2021 Moldovan Super League, the first medal in the team's league history.

References

External links
Ulhas Satyanarayan at Asia-basket.com
Ulhas KS on Twitter

1998 births
Living people
Alumni of the University of Westminster
Basketball players from Tamil Nadu
Guards (basketball)
Indian expatriate sportspeople in England
Indian expatriates in Moldova
Indian men's basketball players
People from New Delhi